Susie Mathis (born Susan Mathis; 29 April 1947) is a former singer, actress and radio presenter who, in later years, became a fundraiser for Francis House Children's Hospice, and many other charities in North West England.

Music and television career
Mathis first appeared in the West End at the age of fifteen and came to fame in March 1968, using the stage name 'Tiger', as the lead singer of the Paper Dolls. They reached number 8 in the UK Singles Chart with "Something Here in My Heart (Keeps A Tellin' Me No)". The Paper Dolls toured widely and topped the bill in many UK cabaret venues, but further record success eluded them and, following some changes of personnel, they split up in early 1975. Mathis also released three solo singles under the name 'Tiger Sue'. She recorded with The Maddisons and Colorado, and also took part in pantomime and made television appearances including Top Of The Pops. Cherry Red released a Paper Dolls special CD celebrating 50 years since their first release.

Radio and television
As well as appearing as an artist on the show, Susie presented Top of the Pops on two occasions and fronted the Granada Television Friday night show Weekend. She also voiced many TV adverts, such as the Say the Leeds and your smiling, Wake up to Magnet and Southern campaigns.

Mathis joined the local Manchester independent radio station, Piccadilly Radio in 1979, and in 1981 became the first female daytime presenter on independent radio. She later joined BBC Radio Manchester and twice won the Sony Radio Personality of the Year Award.

During the Covid-19 lockdown, Susie volunteered to present a show a week for six months for WFM. At the end of 2021, she was seen as one of the talking heads (alongside other music experts, such as Paul Gambaccini, David Grant and Katie Puckrik) on Channel 5's year-by-year pop music countdown series Britain's Biggest 70s Hits, and in 2022 was seen on the channel's subsequent Friday night music series 80s Greatest Pop Videos.

Charity work and activism
Mathis has also been at the forefront of fundraising for Francis House, a children's hospice in Manchester, helping to raise £5 million for the cause. Mathis herself was diagnosed with breast cancer in 2004. As part of the fundraising effort, the 1975 formation of the Paper Dolls reformed for a one-off concert in Bradford in March 2008. Mathis had worked with Kirsty Howard, a 12-year-old fundraiser, who for the night became the Paper Dolls' unofficial fourth member when she sang with them on stage.

Subsequently, in 2009, Mathis became a charity manager, working for Mohammed Al Fayed. She has been organising the Warrington Business Awards for several years.

Solo discography

As Tiger Sue

References

1947 births
Living people
Singers from London
English radio DJs
Mathis, Susie
British radio presenters
British women radio presenters